Elections to Shropshire Council in England were held on 4 June 2009. These were the first elections to the new unitary body, which replaced Shropshire County Council and the district councils of Bridgnorth, North Shropshire, Oswestry, Shrewsbury and Atcham and South Shropshire on 1 April as part of the 2009 local government restructuring across England.

The vote was moved from 7 May to coincide with the European Parliament elections that year.

Counting took place on 5 June at the Sundorne Sports Village in north Shrewsbury. The count was delayed by around 5 hours, resulting in Shropshire being the last local council to declare results in the 2009 local elections.

In total, 74 councillors were elected from 63 newly formed electoral divisions (53 single member divisions, nine 2-member divisions and one 3-member electoral division). The Conservatives won overall control, with 54 councillors elected resulting in a substantial majority of 34. The Liberal Democrats came second with 11 councillors elected, and Labour third with 7 councillors. In addition, the Independent Community and Health Concern candidate in Cleobury Mortimer and one independent candidate were also elected.

Average voter turnout was 42.5% across Shropshire.

Because of the council's unitary status, all divisions are up for election at once, every four years. The next Shropshire Council election took place on 2 May 2013.

Results

Summary of results
Comparisons made against the results of the 2005 election.

Conservative majority: 34.

Central area results
Following are the results for the electoral divisions located in the Central administrative sub-division of Shropshire Council, which covers the area of the former Shrewsbury and Atcham borough. Unless otherwise stated, all divisions elect a single member. The winning candidates are marked in bold.

Abbey

Turnout: 35.1%

Bagley

Turnout: 38.14%

Battlefield

Turnout: 31.23%

Bayston Hill, Column and Sutton
Bayston Hill, Column and Sutton is a three-member division, with voters able to cast three separate votes in the election. In 2009, all three Labour candidates topped the vote, resulting in them being elected.

Turnout: 49.17%

Belle Vue

Turnout: 51.14%

Bowbrook

Turnout: 41.04%

Burnell

Turnout: 52.35%

Castlefields and Ditherington

Turnout: 41.65%

Chirbury and Worthen

Turnout: 59.81%

Copthorne

Turnout: 49.69%

Harlescott

Turnout: 34.21%

Longden

Turnout: 53.31%

Loton

Turnout: 47.23%

Meole

Turnout: 48.18%

Minsterley

Turnout: 42.58%

Monkmoor

Turnout: 35.45%

Porthill

Turnout: 47.99%

Quarry and Coton Hill

Turnout: 38.79%

Radbrook

Turnout: 48.51%

Severn Valley
The Severn Valley division was uncontested in 2009, resulting in the Conservative candidate being elected unopposed.

Sundorne

Turnout: 32.79%

Tern

Turnout: 48.35%

Underdale

Turnout: 43.00%

North area results
Following are the results for the electoral divisions located in the North administrative sub-division of Shropshire Council, which covers the areas of the previous North Shropshire and Oswestry district and borough councils. Unless otherwise stated, all divisions elect a single member. The winning candidates are marked in bold.

Cheswardine

Turnout: 40.37%

Ellesmere Urban

Turnout: 40.52%

Hodnet

Turnout: 42.56%

Llanymynech

Turnout: 42.56%

Market Drayton East

Turnout: 41.84%

Market Drayton West
Market Drayton West is a two-member division, with voters able to cast two separate votes in the election. In 2009, both Conservative candidates topped the vote, resulting in their election.

Turnout: 34.25%

Oswestry East
Oswestry East is a two-member division, with voters able to cast two separate votes in the election. In 2009, both Conservative candidates topped the vote, resulting in their election.

Turnout: 30.47%

Oswestry South

Turnout: 36.39%

Oswestry West

Turnout: 37.04%

Prees

Turnout: 43.65%

Ruyton and Baschurch

Turnout: 46.06%

Selattyn and Gobowen
Selattyn and Gobowen is a two-member division, with voters able to cast two separate votes in the election. The Liberal Democrat candidate and one of the two Conservative candidates topped the poll and they were both elected.

Turnout: 34.42%

Shawbury

Turnout: 42.22%

St Martin's

Turnout: 38.68%

St Oswald

Turnout: 39.78%

The Meres

Turnout: 47.20%

Wem
Wem is a two-member division, with voters able to cast two separate votes in the election. The Liberal Democrat candidate and an independent candidate topped the poll and were both elected.

Turnout: 43.40%

Whitchurch North
Whitchurch North is a two-member division, with voters able to cast two separate votes in the election. In 2009, both Conservative candidates topped the vote, resulting in their election.

Turnout: 34.86%

Whitchurch South

Turnout: 33.85%

Whittington

Turnout: 41.23%

South area results
Following are the results for the electoral divisions located in the South administrative sub-division of Shropshire Council, which covers the areas of the former South Shropshire and Bridgnorth districts. Unless otherwise stated, all divisions elect a single member. The winning candidates are marked in bold.

Albrighton

Turnout: 49.05%

Alveley and Claverley

Turnout: 49.45%

Bishop's Castle

Turnout: 55.83%

Bridgnorth East and Astley Abbotts
Bridgnorth East and Astley Abbotts is a two-member division, with voters able to cast two separate votes in the election. In 2009, both Conservative candidates topped the vote, resulting in their election.

Turnout: 36.29%

Bridgnorth West and Tasley
Bridgnorth West and Tasley is a two-member division, with voters able to cast two separate votes in the election. In 2009, both Conservative candidates topped the vote, resulting in their election.

Turnout: 37.15%

Broseley

Turnout: 41.78%

Brown Clee

Turnout: 44.92%

Church Stretton and Craven Arms
Church Stretton and Craven Arms is a two-member division, with voters able to cast two separate votes in the election. In 2009, both Conservative candidates topped the vote, resulting in their election.

Turnout: 54.92%

Clee

Turnout: 52.69%

Cleobury Mortimer
Cleobury Mortimer is a two-member division, with voters able to cast two separate votes in the election. In 2009, the Independent Community and Health Concern candidate and one of the two Conservative candidates topped the vote, resulting in their election.

Turnout: 47.96%

Clun

Turnout: 61.18%

Corvedale

Turnout: 59.07%

Highley

Turnout: 37.06%

Ludlow East

Turnout: 42.33%

Ludlow North

Turnout: 52.54%

Ludlow South

Turnout: 52.09%

Much Wenlock

Turnout: 47.99%

Shifnal North

Turnout: 40.98%

Shifnal South and Cosford

Turnout: 45.17%

Worfield

Turnout: 48.45%

References

External links
Shropshire Council Election Details & Results
Shropshire Star "Tories Turn County Blue"

2009 English local elections
2009
21st century in Shropshire